Homochitto was a plantation located directly on the Mississippi River in Issaquena County (initially the lower portion of Washington County), Mississippi, United States.

Homochitto Plantation was owned by Stephen Duncan. The 1831 tax rolls indicated that Duncan enslaved 96 individuals on the  property.  In 1865, following the abolition of slavery, a number of freedmen were listed at the Homochitto Plantation. According to one source, Homochitto is a Choctaw name likely meaning "big red", and was earlier applied to the Homochitto River in Mississippi.

Duncan had a reconstruction contract "Disapproved for insufficient compensation to freedmen".

References

Former populated places in Issaquena County, Mississippi